Urmia University of Medical Sciences, is a medical school in Urmia, West Azarbaijan, Iran.

Urmia University of Medical College Established on 1980 as part of Medical School of Urmia University. In 1985 under supervision of Iranian Ministry of Health the school detached from Urmia University and a new university established with the name of Urmia University of Medical Science.

The university has six schools (medicine, pharmacy, paramedical, health, nursing, and dental) and administers all public hospitals in and around the city of Urmia.

See also
Higher education in Iran
List of universities in Iran

External links
Official website

Medical schools in Iran
Universities in Iran
Education in Urmia
Buildings and structures in Urmia

1985 establishments in Iran
Educational institutions established in 1985